Alberto Rodríguez may refer to:
Alberto Rodríguez Larreta (1934–1977), Argentine racing driver
Alberto Rodríguez (cyclist) (born 1947), Uruguayan Olympic cyclist
Alberto Rodríguez Saá (born 1949), Argentine politician
Alberto Rodriguez (FALN) (born 1953), Puerto Rican nationalist
Alberto Rodríguez (wrestler) (born 1964), Cuban Olympic wrestler
Alberto Rodríguez Librero (born 1971), Spanish film director
Alberto Rodríguez Barrera (born 1974), Mexican football player
Alberto Del Rio (Alberto Rodríguez, born 1977), Mexican professional wrestler
Alberto Rodríguez Oliver (born 1982), Spanish professional road racing cyclist
Alberto Rodríguez (footballer, born 1984), Peruvian football player
Alberto Rodríguez (footballer, born 1992), Spanish football centre-back
Alberto Rodríguez (footballer, born 1997), Spanish football centre-back
Alberto Rodríguez (baseball)